Al Lith is a city in the Tihamah region on the coast of the Red Sea south west of the holy city of Mecca. It is the fifth largest city in population in Makkah Province, and it is one of the large sea ports of the Kingdom of Saudi Arabia on the Red Sea, and Miqat Yalamlam is located north of it. The estimated population of Al Lith is over 72,000 people.

Geography
It is located 180 km to the south west from the holy city of Mecca, and 190 km south of Jeddah. Its northern villages are just 90 km away from Mecca. It extends to Hejaz mountains and Adham and Taif cities to the east and extends as far south as Al Qunfudah city. The international coastal road Jeddah - Jizan passes by it.

Climate
Al Lith has a hot desert climate (Köppen climate classification BWh).

History and profile
Al Lith got its name from the Valley of Leith, which is located at the east of it near Ghumayqah village. Al Lith today is a commercial port that receives pilgrims and goods from all corners of the world. In the past, it used to be a large commercial port that receives ships from Jizan, Yemen, and the coast of Africa and exporting those goods after that to Mecca and Jeddah.

The Al Lith area boasts prominent underwater diving sites.

See also

List of cities and towns in Saudi Arabia

References

1925 establishments in Saudi Arabia
Populated places established in 1925
Lith
Lith
Geography of Saudi Arabia
Port cities in the Arabian Peninsula
Port cities and towns in Saudi Arabia
Port cities and towns of the Red Sea
Underwater diving sites in Saudi Arabia